Michel Field (born 17 July 1954) is a French journalist, television presenter, philosopher and novelist. He is the author of several novels. He served as the political director of France Télévisions.

Early life
Michel Field was born as Michel Feldschuh on July 17, 1954 in Saint-Saturnin-lès-Apt, Vaucluse, France. His father, Erwin Feldschuh, was an Austrian Jew who emigrated to France.

Field was educated at the Lycée Claude Bernard, the Lycée Balzac, and the Lycée Condorcet. He joined the Revolutionary Communist League at the age of 14, and he was expelled from his school because of his activism. He graduated from Paris West University Nanterre La Défense. He earned the CAPES and the agrégation in philosophy.

Career
Field started his career as a philosophy teacher in Douai from 1979 to 1982, and in Versailles from 1982 to 1993.

Field is a journalist and television presenter. He became a co-presenter of Panomara, a radio programme on France Culture. He was a contributor to Les Nouvelles littéraires from 1984 to 1985. In 1992, he became a co-presenter on Ciel mon mardi!. He subsequently presented Le Cercle de minuit and Ça balance à Paris, followed by Au Field de la nuit on TF1 and Ring on LCI. He has been a co-presenter of Médiapolis alongside Olivier Duhamel on Europe 1 since 2007. He later served as the head of France 5. In December 2015, he was appointed as the political director of France Télévisions. He resigned in 2017.

Field is the author of several novels and non-fiction books.

Works

References

1954 births
Living people
People from Vaucluse
French people of Austrian-Jewish descent
University of Paris alumni
20th-century French journalists
French television presenters
20th-century French novelists
21st-century French novelists
French male novelists
20th-century French male writers
21st-century French male writers
French male non-fiction writers